Daniel C. Itse (born May 21, 1958) is an American politician who was a conservative Republican member of the New Hampshire House of Representatives from 2001 to 2018.

A native of San Francisco, California, Itse is a professional engineer who resides in Fremont, New Hampshire.

In 2009, Itse introduced a "state sovereignty" resolution based on the Kentucky Resolutions; similar resolutions were introduced in some other states.

References

1958 births
Living people
21st-century American politicians
Engineers from California
American inventors
Republican Party members of the New Hampshire House of Representatives
People from Sherborn, Massachusetts
Politicians from San Francisco
Worcester Polytechnic Institute alumni
People from Rockingham County, New Hampshire